BootstrapCDN is a public content delivery network. It enables users to load CSS, JavaScript and images remotely from its servers. Used by more than 7.9 million websites worldwide (including 30% of the top-10k websites), BootstrapCDN serves more than 70 billion requests a month. In March 2021 the ownership was transferred to the jsDelivr project.

History
NetDNA (formerly MaxCDN, acquired by StackPath) launched BootstrapCDN, the free content delivery network aspect of Bootstrap, with a beta launch on June 7, 2012, and a stable launch on July 5, 2012. Stanford University, Angry Birds and Gizmodo utilize BootstrapCDN.

Font Awesome
Font Awesome, a font designed for use with Twitter Bootstrap, was incorporated into BootstrapCDN on August 21, 2012. The font offers scalable vector icons that are CSS-friendly for customization.

As of July 5, 2013 — a year after it launched — BootstrapCDN transferred 40.73 terabytes and served 3.2 billion requests, with 383 changes to its GitHub repository (git commits). Font Awesome was its most popular requested file with 338,329,273 hits.

Usage
Developers can access BootstrapCDN's CSS and Javascript content through the following links:

References

External links 
 
 
 

Content delivery networks